Buddleja domingensis is a species endemic to the uplands of Haiti and the Dominican Republic, growing in rocky, limestone ravines, along forest edges and roadsides; it was first described and named by Ignatz Urban in 1908.

Description
The yellow inflorescences are 10–27 cm long, with one or rarely two orders of branches, comprising heads 1.5–2.5 cm in diameter, each with 20–50 flowers, borne in leafy-bracted racemes; the corolla tubes are 3–3.5 mm long. Ploidy: 2n = 38 (diploid).

Cultivation
The species is not known to be in cultivation.

Etymology
The species has been given the specific epithet "domingensis", as it occurs on the island of Hispaniola. This island was historically called Santo Domingo, or Saint-Domingue.

References

domingensis
Flora of Haiti
Flora of the Dominican Republic
Flora without expected TNC conservation status